The 2014 Baltimore Orioles season was the 114th season in franchise history, the 61st in Baltimore, and the 23rd at Oriole Park at Camden Yards. The Birds would finish in first place in the American League East Division and return to the playoffs for the second time in three seasons, claiming their first division championship since 1997. The Orioles swept the Detroit Tigers in the Division Series and advanced to the AL Championship Series, where they were swept by the Kansas City Royals.

New Oriole Nelson Cruz led the majors in home runs with 40; following Chris Davis' 2013 championship this was the first time in franchise history two Orioles (or Browns) had won back-to-back home run titles. As a team the Birds hit 211 home runs to lead baseball, their third consecutive 200-homer season (another franchise first).

Preceding offseason
Entering the offseason, the Orioles had 11 arbitration eligible players, three contract options, and several outgoing free agents. They looked to make additions to their starting rotation, to add a "big bat", as well as to improve their bullpen, which was strong in 2012, but "average" in 2013.

Outgoing free agents
LHP Tsuyoshi Wada signed a minor league contract with invitation to spring training with Chicago Cubs on 12/19/13
3B/1B Wilson Betemit – signed a minor league contract with invitation to spring training with Tampa Bay Rays on 2/6/14 
IF Alexi Casilla – re-signed with Baltimore Orioles to a minor league contract with an invitation to spring training on 1/10/14 
RHP Zach Clark – re-signed with Orioles to a minor league contract with an invitation to spring training on 1/7/14
OF Chris Dickerson – signed a minor league contract with an invitation to spring training with Pittsburgh Pirates on 1/6/14 
RHP Scott Feldman – signed a 3-year,  contract with Houston Astros on 12/6/13 
RHP Jason Hammel – signed a 1-year,  contract with Chicago Cubs on 1/31/14 
1B Dan Johnson – signed a minor league contract with an invitation to spring training with Toronto Blue Jays on 11/15/13 
IF Alex Liddi – signed a minor league contract with an invitation to spring training with Chicago White Sox on 11/18/13 
OF Nate McLouth – signed a 2-year,  contract with a third-year club option with Washington Nationals on 12/12/13 
OF Michael Morse – signed a 1-year,  contract with San Francisco Giants on 12/17/13 
IF Yamaico Navarro – signed a minor league contract with an invitation to spring training with New York Yankees on 11/19/13 
OF Jason Pridie – signed a minor league contract with an invitation to spring training with Colorado Rockies on 12/18/13
RHP Jon Rauch – signed a minor league contract with an invitation to spring training with Kansas City Royals on 1/23/14
2B Brian Roberts – signed a 1-year,  contract with New York Yankees on 1/14/14 (Roberts was the longest tenured member of the Baltimore Orioles prior to his departure) 
RHP Francisco Rodríguez – signed a 1-year,  contract with Milwaukee Brewers on 2/7/14 
C Chris Snyder – signed a minor league contract with an invitation to spring training with Washington Nationals on 12/20/13 
C Taylor Teagarden – signed a minor league contract with an invitation to spring training with New York Mets on 1/6/14

Incoming free agents
RHP Ryan Webb – signed a 2-year, $4.5 million free agent contract on 12/10/13
OF Quintin Berry – signed a minor-league contract with an invitation to spring training on 1/03/2014 (Contract selected on 9/2/2014)
OF Delmon Young – signed a minor-league contract with an invitation to spring training on 1/13/2014 (Contract selected on 3/30/2014)
SS Alex González – signed a minor-league contract with an invitation to spring training on 1/31/2014
RHP Evan Meek – signed a minor-league contract with an invitation to spring training on 2/5/2014 (Contract selected on 3/30/2014)
RHP Ubaldo Jiménez – Signed a 4-year, $50 million free agent contract on 2/14/2014
OF Nelson Cruz – Signed a 1-year, $8 million free agent contract on 2/24/2014

Preseason trades
RHP Brad Brach – acquired from the San Diego Padres in trade for RHP Devin Jones on 11/25/2013
2B Jemile Weeks – acquired from the Oakland Athletics along with C David Freitas in a trade for RHP Jim Johnson on 12/3/2013
OF David Lough – acquired from the Kansas City Royals in trade for 3B Danny Valencia on 12/18/2013
IF Steve Lombardozzi Jr. – acquired from the Detroit Tigers in trade for SS Alex González on 3/24/2014

Regular season

March/April
On March 31, the Orioles won their 2014 regular season opener against the Boston Red Sox, but then proceeded to lose their next four games. After a full week and a 4–2 loss to the New York Yankees, the Orioles were in last place in the American League East and 3 games below .500.  Orioles All-Star 3rd baseman Manny Machado, still recovering from off-season surgery, did not play in any games for the Orioles during the month of April; but Orioles catcher Matt Wieters got off to an uncharacteristically fast start hitting .338 with 4 homeruns and 15 RBIs.  The Orioles finished the month with 11 wins and 12 losses.

May
Tommy Hunter started the season as the Orioles closer and was successful in 11 of his 12 save opportunities, but he blew 2 consecutive saves on May 10 and 13 and then was placed on the 15-day disabled list. On May 11, the Orioles placed catcher Matt Wieters on the disabled list. Wieters was hitting over .300 and would ultimately be lost to the team for the entire season.  The Orioles finished May with 15 wins and 15 losses but moved up to 3rd place in the American League East. The one bright spot in an otherwise mediocre April–May was the torrid hitting of new Oriole Nelson Cruz; by May 31 Cruz led all of MLB with a staggering 20 home runs and 51 runs batted in.

June
On June 6, the Orioles lost to the Oakland Athletics, 4–3 in 11 innings, dropping them 6 and 1/2 games out of first place.  It would be the farthest out of first that the Orioles would be all season.
Adam Jones batted .348 with nine homers and 20 RBIs in June.  Utility player Steve Pearce, who had appeared in only 3 games for the Orioles in April, batted .361 in June with 5 home runs and 13 RBI's.
The Birds finished the month with 16 wins and 12 losses, trailing the first-place Blue Jays by one game.

July
On Saturday July 5, the Orioles split a double-header with the Boston Red Sox and moved into sole possession of first place in the American League East and would remain in first place for the rest of the season. By the All-Star break, the Orioles had increased their lead to 4 games and three Oriole players were voted by the fans to the American League squad:  Matt Weiters (his third), Adam Jones (his fourth) and Nelson Cruz (his third). This marked the first time in club history that three Orioles were voted onto the American League squad in consecutive years.  By the end of the month, new Oriole closer Zach Britton had 11 saves for the month and the Orioles led the American League East by 1.5 games.

August
On August 9, reserve catcher Caleb Joseph hit a home run in the Orioles' 10–3 win over the St. Louis Cardinals; making him the first Orioles catcher to homer in 5 consecutive games.
Orioles 3rd baseman Machado injured his right knee on an awkward swing against the New York Yankees on August 11.  After going on the disabled list and trying to rest his knee, he decided to have his knee surgically repaired thus ending his season.  Oriole shortstop J. J. Hardy batted .322 for the month with 5 homeruns and 18 RBI's. First baseman Chris Davis filled in for Machado at third and hit 7 homeruns with 17 rbi's for the month.  The Orioles ended the month of August with four consecutive wins; increasing their lead in the American League East to 9 full games over the second place Yankees.

September
The Orioles started the month with a 6–4 loss to the Minnesota Twins but still maintained an 8 and 1/2 game lead over the second place Yankees.  Newly acquired outfielder Alejandro De Aza also started the month with the Orioles and before September was over he would hit 3 triples, 3 home runs, drive in 10 runs and bat over .300.  On September 7, the Orioles beat the Tampa Bay Rays 7–5; Nelson Cruz went 4-for-5 with two home runs and 7 RBIs.  On September 12, Orioles' first baseman Chris Davis was suspended for 25 games for testing positive for amphetamine. Davis claimed he tested positive due to the use of adderall—for which he previous had a "therapeutic use exemption" but did not have for the 2014 season.

On Tuesday, September 16, the Orioles clinched the American League East Championship by beating the second place Toronto Blue Jays 8–2. The Orioles had not won an American League East title since 1997 and Tuesday marked the first time since 1969 that the Orioles won a division title in front of their fans at home. Steve Pearce, who had replaced Chris Davis at first base, blasted a three-run homerun off Toronto right-hander Drew Hutchison to give the Orioles a 3–1 lead in the first inning. Oriole right-hander Ubaldo Jiménez, who hadn't been in the starting rotation for a month, picked up the win.  On September 25, the Orioles gave up a walk off hit to Derek Jeter in his final game at Yankee Stadium. 
The Orioles finished the season with 211 home runs. 2014 is  the third consecutive season the Orioles hit more than 200 home runs and the first time in franchise history that they did it 3 years in a row. The Orioles 401 walks were also the fewest walks as the modern Orioles and their 44 stolen bases were their fewest since 1961.

In-season transactions

RHP Preston Guilmet – acquired from Cleveland Indians in trade for 2B Torsten Boss on 4/7/2014
LF Steve Pearce – released on 4/27/2014
LF Steve Pearce – signed to a 1-year, $850K free agent contract on 4/29/2014
C Nick Hundley – acquired from San Diego Padres in trade for LHP Troy Patton on 5/24/2014
OF Nolan Reimold – claimed off waivers by Toronto Blue Jays on 7/6/2014
3B Jimmy Paredes – acquired from Kansas City Royals for cash on 7/24/2014
LHP Andrew Miller – acquired from Boston Red Sox in trade for LHP Eduardo Rodríguez on 7/31/2014
OF Alejandro De Aza – acquired from Chicago White Sox in trade for RHP Mark Blackmar and RHP  Miguel Chalas on 8/31/2014
3B Kelly Johnson and 3B Michael Almanzar – acquired from Boston Red Sox in trade for 2B Jemile Weeks and 2B Ivan De Jesus Jr. on 8/31/2014

Injuries etc.

March 31 – May 1: 3B Manny Machado on 15-day disabled list retroactive to 3/21 (offseason left knee surgery)
March 31 – May 1: LHP Troy Patton on restricted list (25-game suspension for amphetamine use imposed 12/20/2013)
April 7 –  OF Nolan Reimold on 60-day disabled list (July 2013 back surgery) 
April 26 – May 11: 1B Chris Davis on 15-day disabled list (oblique strain)
May 11 – August 13: C Matt Wieters on 15-day disabled list (right elbow strain)
May 22 – June 8: RHP Tommy Hunter on 15-day disabled list (left groin strain)
May 25 – May 27: 1B Chris Davis on paternity list
May 31 – June 17: RHP Miguel González on 15-day disabled list (oblique strain)
June 2 – June 9: RHP Johan Santana on 15-day disabled list (April 2013 shoulder surgery)
June 9 – RHP Johan Santana transferred from the 15-day to the 60-day disabled list
June 17 – C Matt Wieters underwent Tommy John surgery (out for season)
June 22 – July 21 RHP Bud Norris on 15-day disabled list (right groin strain)
June 30 – July 5: 3B Manny Machado on restricted list (5-game suspension for bat throwing)
July 8 – August 9: RHP Ubaldo Jiménez on 15-day disabled list (right ankle sprain)
August 12 – September 2: 3B Manny Machado on 15-day disabled list (right knee sprain)
August 13: C Matt Wieters transferred from 15-day to 60-day disabled list
August 27: 3B Manny Machado underwent right knee surgery (out for season)
September 2: 3B Manny Machado transferred from 15-day to 60-day disabled list
September 12 – 1B Chris Davis on restricted list (25-game suspension for amphetamine use)

Season standings

American League East

Record vs. Opponents

Game log

|- bgcolor=#bbffbb
| 1 || March 31 || Red Sox || 2–1 || Britton (1–0) || Lester (0–1) || Hunter (1) || Camden Yards || 46,685 || 1–0 || W1
|- style="text-align:center; style="background-color:#ffbbbb;"
| 2 || April 2 || Red Sox || 2–6 || Lackey (1–0) || Jiménez (0–1) || — || Camden Yards || 25,078 || 1–1 || L1
|- style="text-align:center; style="background-color:#ffbbbb;"
| 3 || April 3 || Red Sox || 3–4 || Doubront (1–0) || Chen (0–1) || Uehara (1) || Camden Yards || 20,880 || 1–2 || L2
|- style="text-align:center; style="background-color:#ffbbbb;"
| 4 || April 4 || @ Tigers || 4–10 || Smyly (1–0) || González (0–1) || — || Comerica Park || 23,625 || 1–3 || L3
|- style="text-align:center; style="background-color:#ffbbbb;"
| 5 || April 5 || @ Tigers || 6–7 || Porcello (1–0) || Norris (0–1) || Nathan (1) || Comerica Park || 32,041 || 1–4 || L4
|- bgcolor=#bbffbb
| 6 || April 6 || @ Tigers || 3–1 || Tillman (1–0) || Verlander (0–1) || Hunter (2) || Comerica Park || 34,261 || 2–4 || W1
|- style="text-align:center; style="background-color:#ffbbbb;"
| 7 || April 7 || @ Yankees || 2–4 || Kuroda (1–1) || Jiménez (0–2) || Kelley (1) || Yankee Stadium || 48,142 || 2–5 || L1
|- bgcolor=#bbffbb
| 8 || April 8 || @ Yankees || 14–5 || Chen (1–1) || Nova (1–1) || — || Yankee Stadium || 35,864 || 3–5 || W1
|- bgcolor=#bbffbb
| 9 || April 9 || @ Yankees || 5–4 || Matusz (1–0) || Kelley (0–1) || Hunter (3) || Yankee Stadium || 39,412 || 4–5 || W2
|- style="text-align:center; style="background-color:#ffbbbb;"
| 10 || April 11 || Blue Jays || 0–2 || McGowan (1–1) || Tillman (1–1) || Santos (4) || Camden Yards || 22,327 || 4–6 || L1
|- bgcolor=#bbffbb
| 11 || April 12 || Blue Jays || 2–1 (12) || Britton (2–0) || Redmond (0–1) || — || Camden Yards || 30,446 || 5–6 || W1
|- style="text-align:center; style="background-color:#ffbbbb;"
| 12 || April 13 || Blue Jays || 3–11 || Buehrle (3–0) || Jiménez (0–3) || — || Camden Yards || 39,281 || 5–7 || L1
|- bgcolor=#bbffbb
| 13 || April 14 || Rays || 7–1 || Chen (2–1) || Archer (1–1) || — || Camden Yards || 15,799 || 6–7 || W1
|- style="text-align:center; style="background-color:#bbbbbb;"
| − || April 15 || Rays || colspan=8 | Postponed (rain).  Makeup date June 27 as part of doubleheader.
|- bgcolor=#bbffbb
| 14 || April 16 || Rays || 3–0 || González (1–1) || Odorizzi (1–2) || Hunter (4) || Camden Yards || 22,611 || 7–7 || W2
|- bgcolor=#bbffbb
| 15 || April 18 || @ Red Sox || 8–4 || Tillman (2–1) || Lackey (2–2) || O'Day (1) || Fenway Park || 36,408 || 8–7 || W3
|- style="text-align:center; style="background-color:#ffbbbb;"
| 16 || April 19 || @ Red Sox || 2–4 || Tazawa (1–0) || Norris (0–2) || Uehara (4) || Fenway Park || 37,689 || 8–8 || L1
|- style="text-align:center; style="background-color:#ffbbbb;"
| 17 || April 20 || @ Red Sox || 5–6 || Mujica (1–1) || Matusz (1–1) || — || Fenway Park || 33,947 || 8–9 || L2
|- bgcolor=#bbffbb
| 18 || April 21 || @ Red Sox || 7–6 || Chen (3–1) || Buchholz (0–2) || Hunter (5) || Fenway Park || 37,513 || 9–9 || W1
|- style="text-align:center; style="background-color:#ffbbbb;"
| 19 || April 22 || @ Blue Jays || 3–9 || Delabar (2–0) || Meek (0–1) || — || Rogers Centre || 14,866 || 9–10 || L1
|- bgcolor=#bbffbb
| 20 || April 23 || @ Blue Jays || 10–8 || Tillman (3–1) || Redmond (0–2) || Hunter (6) || Rogers Centre || 15,202|| 10–10 || W1
|- bgcolor=#bbffbb
| 21 || April 24 || @ Blue Jays || 11–4 || Norris (1–2) || Cecil (0–1) || — || Rogers Centre || 16,283 || 11–10 || W2
|- style="text-align:center; style="background-color:#ffbbbb;"
| 22 || April 25 || Royals || 0–5 || Ventura (2–1) || Jiménez (0–4) || || Camden Yards || 22,478 || 11–11 || L1
|- bgcolor=#bbffbb
| 23 || April 26 || Royals || 3–2 (10) || Britton (3–0) || Duffy (1–1) || — || Camden Yards || 34,941 || 12–11 || W1
|- style="text-align:center; style="background-color:#ffbbbb;"
| 24 || April 27 || Royals || 3–9 || Shields (3–2) || González (1–2) || — || Camden Yards || 38,368 || 12–12 || L1
|- style="text-align:center; style="background-color:#bbbbbb;"
| — || April 29 || Pirates || colspan=8 | Postponed (rain).  Makeup date May 1 as part of doubleheader.
|- style="text-align:center; style="background-color:#bbbbbb;"
| — || April 30 || Pirates || colspan=8 | Postponed (rain).  Makeup date May 1 as part of doubleheader.
|-

|- bgcolor=#bbffbb
| 25 || May 1 || Pirates || 5–1 || Norris (2–2) || Morton (0–4) || Hunter (7) || Camden Yards || — || 13–12 || W1
|- bgcolor=#bbffbb
| 26 || May 1 || Pirates || 6–5 (10) || Hunter (1–0) || Pimentel (2–1) || — || Camden Yards || 28,290 || 14–12 || W2
|- bgcolor=#bbffbb
| 27 || May 2 || @ Twins || 3–0 || Jiménez (1–4) || Nolasco (2–3) || Hunter (8) || Target Field || 24,165 || 15–12 || W3
|- style="text-align:center; style="background-color:#ffbbbb;"
| 28 || May 3 || @ Twins || 1–6 || Correia (1–3) || Chen (3–2) || — || Target Field || 25,318 || 15–13 || L1
|- style="text-align:center; style="background-color:#ffbbbb;"
| 29 || May 4 || @ Twins || 2–5 || Hughes (3–1) || González (1–3) || Perkins (7) || Target Field || 25,559 || 15–14 || L2
|- bgcolor=#bbffbb
| 30 || May 6 || @ Rays || 5–3 || O'Day (1–0) || Peralta (1–2) || Hunter (9) || Tropicana Field || 11,855 || 16–14 || W1
|- bgcolor=#bbffbb
| 31 || May 7 || @ Rays || 4–3 ||Webb (1–0)|| Gomes (2–2)|| Hunter (10)|| Tropicana Field ||11,282 || 17–14 ||W2
|- bgcolor=#bbffbb
| 32 || May 8 || @ Rays || 3–1 || Jiménez (2–4) || Price (3–3) || O'Day (2) || Tropicana Field || 11,076 || 18–14 || W3
|- bgcolor=#bbffbb
| 33 || May 9 || Astros || 4–3 ||Chen (4–2) ||Williams (1–2) || Hunter (11) || Camden Yards ||28,875 || 19–14 ||W4
|- bgcolor=#bbffbb
| 34 || May 10 || Astros || 5–4 (10) ||Webb (2–0) ||Clemens (0–1) || —  || Camden Yards ||26,264 || 20–14 || W5
|- style="text-align:center; style="background-color:#ffbbbb;"
| 35 || May 11 || Astros || 2–5 || Cosart (2–3) || Tillman (3–2) || Qualls (2) || Camden Yards || 45,944 || 20–15 || L1
|- style="text-align:center; style="background-color:#ffbbbb;"
| 36 || May 12 || Tigers || 1–4 || Porcello (6–1) || Norris (2–3) || Nathan (8) || Camden Yards || 24,517 || 20–16 || L2
|- style="text-align:center; style="background-color:#ffbbbb;"
| 37 || May 13 || Tigers || 1–4 || Miller (1–0) || Hunter (1–1) || Nathan (9) || Camden Yards || 29,950 || 20–17 || L3
|- style="text-align:center; style="background-color:#ffbbbb;"
| 38 || May 14 || Tigers || 5–7 || Verlander (5–2) || Gausman (0–1) || Nathan (10) || Camden Yards || 36,727 || 20–18 || L4
|- bgcolor=#bbffbb
| 39 || May 15 || @ Royals || 2–1 || Chen (5–2) || Ventura (2–3) || Britton (1) || Kauffman Stadium ||12,455 || 21–18 || W1
|- bgcolor=#bbffbb
| 40 || May 16 || @ Royals || 4–0 || Tillman (4–2) || Guthrie (2–3) || — || Kauffman Stadium || 25,985|| 22–18 || W2
|- style="text-align:center; style="background-color:#ffbbbb;"
| 41 || May 17 || @ Royals || 0–1 || Duffy (2–3) || Norris (2–4) || Holland (11) || Kauffman Stadium || 24,064 || 22–19 || L1
|- style="text-align:center; style="background-color:#ffbbbb;"
| 42 || May 18 || @ Royals || 6–8 || Shields (6–3) || Jiménez (2–5) || Holland (12) || Kauffman Stadium || 22,692 || 22–20 || L2
|- bgcolor=#bbffbb
| 43 || May 20 || @ Pirates || 9–2 || González (2–3) || Liriano (0–4) || — || PNC Park || 22,787 || 23–20 || W1
|- style="text-align:center; style="background-color:#ffbbbb;"
| 44 || May 21 || @ Pirates || 8–9 || Morris (4–0) || Webb (2–1) || Melancon (7) || PNC Park || 19,365 || 23–21 || L1
|- style="text-align:center; style="background-color:#ffbbbb;"
| 45 || May 22 || Indians || 7–8 (13) || Outman (4–0) || Patton (0–1) || Atchison (1) || Camden Yards || 18,894 || 23–22 || L2
|- bgcolor=#bbffbb
| 46 || May 23 || Indians || 8–4 || Norris (3–4) || House (0–1) || — || Camden Yards || 39,602 || 24–22 || W1
|- style="text-align:center; style="background-color:#ffbbbb;"
| 47 || May 24 || Indians || 0–9 || Kluber (5–3) || Jiménez (2–6) || — || Camden Yards || 36,873 || 24–23 || L1
|- bgcolor=#bbffbb
| 48 || May 25 || Indians || 4–2 || González (3–3) || Bauer (1–2) || Britton (2) || Camden Yards || 37,649 || 25–23 || W1
|- bgcolor=#bbffbb
| 49 || May 26 || @ Brewers || 7–6 (10) || O'Day (2–0) || Wooten (1–2) || Britton (3) || Miller Park || 42,889 || 26–23 || W2
|- style="text-align:center; style="background-color:#ffbbbb;"
| 50 || May 27 || @ Brewers || 6–7 (10) || Rodriguez (2–1) || McFarland (0–1) || — || Miller Park || 25,552 || 26–24 || L1
|- style="text-align:center; style="background-color:#ffbbbb;"
| 51 || May 28 || @ Brewers || 3–8 || Gallardo (3–3) || Norris (3–5) || – || Miller Park || 28,280 || 26–25 || L2
|- style="text-align:center; style="background-color:#ffbbbb;"
| 52 || May 29 || @ Astros || 1–3 || Fields (1–3) || Guilmet (0–1) || Qualls (4) || Minute Maid Park || 22,884 || 26–26 || L3
|- style="text-align:center; style="background-color:#ffbbbb;"
| 53 || May 30 || @ Astros || 1–2 || Oberholtzer (2–6) || González (3–4) || Qualls (5) || Minute Maid Park || 38,482 || 26–27 || L4
|- bgcolor=#bbffbb
| 54 || May 31 || @ Astros || 4–1 || Tillman (5–2) || Keuchel (6–3) || Britton (4) || Minute Maid Park || 29,619 || 27–27 || W1
|-

|- bgcolor=#bbffbb
| 55 || June 1 || @ Astros || 9–4 || Chen (6–2) || Feldman (3–3) || – || Minute Maid Park || 17,022 || 28–27 || W2
|- bgcolor=#bbffbb
| 56 || June 3 || @ Rangers || 8–3 || Matusz (2–1) || Ogando (2–3) || – || Globe Life Park in Arlington || 31,542 || 29–27 || W3
|- bgcolor=#bbffbb
| 57 || June 4 || @ Rangers || 6–5 || Norris (4–5) || Martinez (1–2) || Britton (5) || Globe Life Park in Arlington || 27,934 || 30–27 || W4
|- style="text-align:center; style="background-color:#ffbbbb;"
| 58 || June 5 || @ Rangers || 6–8 || Ross (2–4) || Matusz (2–2) || Soria (12) || Globe Life Park in Arlington || 34,254 || 30–28 || L1
|- style="text-align:center; style="background-color:#ffbbbb;"
| 59 || June 6 || Athletics || 3–4 (11) || Abad (1–2) || Meek (0–2) || Doolittle (8) || Camden Yards || 28,076 || 30–29 || L2
|- bgcolor=#bbffbb
| 60 || June 7 || Athletics || 6–3 || Gausman (1–1) || Gray (6–2) || – || Camden Yards || 44,202 || 31–29 || W1
|- style="text-align:center; style="background-color:#ffbbbb;"
| 61 || June 8 || Athletics || 1–11 || Kazmir (7–2) || Jiménez (2–7) || – || Camden Yards || 38,244 || 31–30 || L1
|- bgcolor=#bbffbb
| 62 || June 9 || Red Sox || 4–0 || Norris (5–5) || Peavy (1–4) || – || Camden Yards || 19,729 || 32–30 || W1
|- style="text-align:center; style="background-color:#ffbbbb;"
| 63 || June 10 || Red Sox || 0–1 || Workman (1–0) || Tillman (5–3) || Uehara (13) || Camden Yards || 24,184 || 32–31 || L1
|- bgcolor=#bbffbb
| 64 || June 11 || Red Sox || 6–0 || Chen (7–2) || De La Rosa (1–2) || – || Camden Yards || 25,886 || 33–31 || W1
|- bgcolor=#bbffbb
| 65 || June 12 || Blue Jays || 4–2 || Gausman (2–1) || Buehrle (10–3) || Britton (6) || Camden Yards || 17,403 || 34–31 || W2
|- style="text-align:center; style="background-color:#ffbbbb;"
| 66 || June 13 || Blue Jays || 0–4 || Hutchison (5–4) || Jiménez (2–8) || McGowan (1) || Camden Yards || 44,031 || 34–32 || L1
|- bgcolor=#bbffbb
| 67 || June 14 || Blue Jays || 3–2 || Norris (6–5) || Dickey (6–5) || Britton (7) || Camden Yards || 33,901 || 35–32 || W1
|- style="text-align:center; style="background-color:#ffbbbb;"
| 68 || June 15 || Blue Jays || 2–5 || Happ (6–3) || Tillman (5–4) || Janssen (12) || Camden Yards || 46,469 || 35–33 || L1
|- style="text-align:center; style="background-color:#ffbbbb;"
| 69 || June 16 || @ Rays || 4–5 || McGee (3–0) || O'Day (2–1) || Oviedo (1) || Tropicana Field || 10,576 || 35–34 || L2
|- bgcolor=#bbffbb
| 70 || June 17 || @ Rays || 7–5 || González (4–4) || Bédard (3–5) || Britton (8) || Tropicana Field || 10,803 || 36–34 || W1
|- bgcolor=#bbffbb
| 71 || June 18 || @ Rays || 2–0 || Gausman (3–1) || Cobb (2–5) || Britton (9) || Tropicana Field || 12,448 || 37–34 || W2
|- style="text-align:center; style="background-color:#ffbbbb;"
| 72 || June 20 || @ Yankees || 3–5 || Huff (2–0) || Britton (3–1) || – || Yankee Stadium || 46,197 || 37–35 || L1
|- bgcolor=#bbffbb
| 73 || June 21 || @ Yankees || 6–1 || Norris (7–5) || Nuño (1–4) || – || Yankee Stadium || 47,165 || 38–35 || W1
|- bgcolor=#bbffbb
| 74 || June 22 || @ Yankees || 8–0 || Tillman (6–4) || Tanaka (11–2) || – || Yankee Stadium || 47,493 || 39–35 || W2
|- bgcolor=#bbffbb
| 75 || June 23 || White Sox || 6–4 || Brach (1–0) || Belisario (3–4) || – || Camden Yards || 17,931 || 40–35 || W3
|- style="text-align:center; style="background-color:#ffbbbb;"
| 76 || June 24 || White Sox || 2–4 || Quintana (4–7) || González (4–5) || Belisario (8) || Camden Yards || 20,596 || 40–36 || L1
|- bgcolor=#bbffbb
| 77 || June 25 || White Sox || 5–4 (12) || Hunter (2–1) || Webb (4–2) || – || Camden Yards || 22,020 || 41–36 || W1
|- style="text-align:center; style="background-color:#ffbbbb;"
| 78 || June 27 || Rays || 2–5 || Colomé (1–0) || Gausman (3–2) || McGee (2) || Camden Yards || 15,614 || 41–37 || L1
|- bgcolor=#bbffbb
| 79 || June 27 || Rays || 4–1 || Tillman (7–4) || Oviedo (3–3) || Britton (10) || Camden Yards || 34,895 || 42–37 || W1
|- style="text-align:center; style="background-color:#ffbbbb;"
| 80 || June 28 || Rays || 4–5 || Bédard (4–5) || Chen (7–3) || McGee (3) || Camden Yards || 36,387 || 42–38 || L1
|- style="text-align:center; style="background-color:#ffbbbb;"
| 81 || June 29 || Rays || 7–12 || Cobb (3–6) || Meek (0–3) || – || Camden Yards || 32,665 || 42–39 || L2
|- bgcolor=#bbffbb
| 82 || June 30 || Rangers || 7–1 || Jiménez (3–8) || Saunders (0–5) || – || Camden Yards || 15,252 || 43–39 || W1
|-

|- bgcolor=#bbffbb
| 83 || July 1 || Rangers || 8–3 || McFarland (1–1) || Martinez (1–6) || – || Camden Yards || 19,150 || 44–39 || W2
|- bgcolor=#bbffbb
| 84 || July 2 || Rangers || 6–4 || Brach (2–0) || Cotts (2–5) || Britton (11) || Camden Yards || 13,478 || 45–39 || W3
|- bgcolor=#bbffbb
| 85 || July 3 || Rangers || 5–2 || Chen (8–3) || Baker (0–2) || Britton (12) || Camden Yards || 24,535 || 46–39 || W4
|- style="text-align:center; style="background-color:#bbbbbb;"
| – || July 4 || @ Red Sox || colspan=8 | Postponed (rain).  Makeup date July 5 as part of doubleheader.
|- style="text-align:center; style="background-color:#ffbbbb;"
| 86 || July 5 || @ Red Sox || 2–3 || Uehara (4–2) ||McFarland (1–2) || – || Fenway Park || 35,714 || 46–40 || L1
|- bgcolor=#bbffbb
| 87 || July 5 || @ Red Sox || 7–4 || Brach (3–0) || Lackey (9–6) || Britton (13) || Fenway Park || 36,468 || 47–40 || W1
|- bgcolor=#bbffbb
| 88 || July 6 || @ Red Sox || 7–6 (12) || Brach (4–0) || Mujica (2–4) || Britton (14) || Fenway Park || 35,811 || 48–40 || W2
|- bgcolor=#bbffbb
| 89 || July 7 || @ Nationals || 8–2 (11) || McFarland (2–2) || Stammen (0–4)  || – || Nationals Park || 35,126  || 49–40  ||W3
|- style="text-align:center; style="background-color:#bbbbbb;"
| – || July 8 || @ Nationals || colspan=8 | Postponed (rain).  Makeup date August 4.
|- style="text-align:center; style="background-color:#ffbbbb;"
| 90 || July 9 || Nationals || 2–6 || Fister (8–2) || Norris (7–6) || – || Camden Yards || 35,575 || 49–41 || L1
|- bgcolor=#bbffbb
| 91 || July 10 || Nationals || 4–3 || Chen (9–3) || Gonzalez (6–5) || Britton (15) || Camden Yards || 30,417 || 50–41 || W1
|- bgcolor=#bbffbb
| 92 || July 11 || Yankees || 3–2 (10) ||McFarland (3–2) ||Warren (1–5) ||– || Camden Yards || 45,389 || 51–41 || W2
|- style="text-align:center; style="background-color:#ffbbbb;"
| 93 || July 12 || Yankees || 0–3 || Greene (2–0) || Tillman (7–5) || Robertson (23) || Camden Yards || 46,667 || 51–42 || L1
|- style="text-align:center; style="background-color:#bbfbbb;"
| 94 || July 13 || Yankees || 3–1 (5) || Gausman (4–2) || Whitley (4–3) || – || Camden Yards || 34,483 || 52–42 || W1
|- style="text-align:center; style="background-color:#bbcaff;"
| ASG || July 15 || All-Star Game || NL 3–5 AL || Scherzer || Neshek || Perkins || colspan="3" |Target Field || Box
|- style="text-align:center; style="background-color:#ffbbbb;"
| 95 || July 18 || @ Athletics || 4–5 || O'Flaherty (1–0) || Britton (3–2) || – || O.co Coliseum || 27,232 || 52–43 || L1
|- bgcolor=#bbffbb
| 96 || July 19 || @ Athletics || 8–4 || Chen (10–3) || Hammel (8–7) || Britton (16) || O.co Coliseum || 36,067 || 53–43 || W1
|- style="text-align:center; style="background-color:#ffbbbb;"
| 97 || July 20 || @ Athletics || 2–10 || Gray (11–3) || Gausman (4–3) || – || O.co Coliseum || 30,124 || 53–44 || L1
|- bgcolor=#bbffbb
| 98 || July 21 || @ Angels || 4–2 || Norris (8–6) || Shoemaker (7–3) || Britton (17) || Angel Stadium of Anaheim || 39,028 || 54–44 || W1
|- bgcolor=#bbffbb
| 99 || July 22 || @ Angels || 4–2 || González (5–5) || Morin (2–3) || Britton (18) || Angel Stadium of Anaheim || 35,353 || 55–44 || W2
|- style="text-align:center; style="background-color:#ffbbbb;"
| 100 || July 23 || @ Angels || 2–3 || Weaver (11–6) || Hunter (2–2) || Street (25) || Angel Stadium of Anaheim || 40,185 || 55–45 || L1
|- bgcolor=#bbffbb
| 101 || July 24 || @ Mariners || 4–0 || Chen (11–3) || Iwakuma (8–5) || – || Safeco Field || 19,621 || 56–45 || W1
|- bgcolor=#bbffbb
| 102 || July 25 || @ Mariners || 2–1 (10) || O'Day (3–1) || Furbush (1–5) || Britton (19) || Safeco Field || 34,792 || 57–45 || W2
|- style="text-align:center; style="background-color:#ffbbbb;"
| 103 || July 26 || @ Mariners || 3–4 || Young (9–6) || Norris (8–7) || Rodney (28) || Safeco Field || 36,936 || 57–46 || L1
|- bgcolor=#bbffbb
| 104 || July 27 || @ Mariners || 3–2 || McFarland (4–2) || Medina (4–2) || Britton (20) || Safeco Field || 26,523 || 58–46 || W1
|- bgcolor=#bbffbb
| 105 || July 29 || Angels || 7–6 (12) || Webb (3–1) || Rasmus (2–1) || – || Camden Yards || 36,882 || 59–46 || W2
|- bgcolor=#bbffbb
| 106 || July 30 || Angels || 4–3 || Gausman (5–3) || Richards (11–4) || Britton (21) || Camden Yards || 27,195 || 60–46 || W3
|- style="text-align:center; style="background-color:#ffbbbb;"
| 107 || July 31 || Angels || 0–1 (13) || Santiago (3–7) || Webb (3–2) || Street (28) || Camden Yards || 24,974 || 60–47 || L1
|-

|- bgcolor=#bbffbb
| 108 || August 1 || Mariners || 2–1 || Chen (12–3) || Elías (8–9) || Britton (22) || Camden Yards || 39,487 || 61–47 || W1
|- style="text-align:center; style="background-color:#ffbbbb;"
| 109 || August 2 || Mariners || 3–6 ||Leone (4–2) ||González (5–6) || – || Camden Yards ||36,508 || 61–48 ||L1
|- bgcolor=#bbffbb
| 110 || August 3 || Mariners || 1–0 ||Tillman (8–5) ||Iwakuma (9–6) ||Britton (23) || Camden Yards ||35,217 || 62–48 ||W1
|- bgcolor=#bbffbb
| 111 || August 4 || @ Nationals || 7–3 || Gausman (6–3)  || Roark (11–7)  || – || Nationals Park || 42,181 || 63–48  ||W2
|- bgcolor=#bbffbb
| 112 || August 5 || @ Blue Jays || 9–3 ||Norris (9–7) ||Buehrle (11–8) || – || Rogers Centre ||36,183 || 64–48 || W3
|- style="text-align:center; style="background-color:#ffbbbb;"
| 113 || August 6 || @ Blue Jays || 1–5 || Hutchison (8–9) || Chen (12–4) || – || Rogers Centre || 33,054 || 64–49 || L1
|- bgcolor=#bbffbb
| 114 || August 7 || @ Blue Jays || 2–1 ||González (6–6) || Happ (8-6)||Britton (24) || Rogers Centre ||34,676 || 65–49 ||W1
|- bgcolor=#bbffbb
| 115 || August 8 || Cardinals || 12–2 || Tillman (9–5) || Masterson (5–7) || – || Camden Yards || 43,743 || 66–49 || W2
|- bgcolor=#bbffbb
| 116 || August 9 || Cardinals || 10–3 || Jiménez (4–8) || Lackey (12–8) ||– || Camden Yards ||40,894 || 67–49 ||W3
|- style="text-align:center; style="background-color:#ffbbbb;"
| 117 || August 10 || Cardinals || 3–8 || Lynn (12–8) || Gausman (6–4) || – || Camden Yards || 27,779 || 67–50 || L1
|- bgcolor=#bbffbb
| 118 || August 11 || Yankees || 11–3 ||Norris (10–7) ||Capuano (1–3) ||– || Camden Yards ||34,018 || 68–50 ||W1
|- style="text-align:center; style="background-color:#bbbbbb;"
| –  || August 12 || Yankees || colspan=8 | Postponed (rain). Makeup date September 12 as part of doubleheader.
|- bgcolor=#bbffbb
| 119 || August 13 || Yankees || 5–3 ||O'Day (4–1) || Kelley (2–4) || Britton (25) || Camden Yards ||37,587 || 69–50 ||W2
|- style="text-align:center; style="background-color:#ffbbbb;"
| 120 || August 15 || @ Indians || 1–2 (11) || Atchison (6–0) || Matusz (2–3) || – || Progressive Field || 27,845 || 69–51 || L1
|- style="text-align:center; style="background-color:#ffbbbb;"
| 121 || August 16 || @ Indians || 0–6 || Carrasco (5–4) || Jiménez (4–9) || – || Progressive Field || 27,881 || 69–52 || L2
|- bgcolor=#bbffbb
| 122 || August 17 || @ Indians || 4–1 || Gausman (7–4) || Salazar (4–6) || Britton (26) || Progressive Field || 22,564 || 70–52 || W1
|- bgcolor=#bbffbb
| 123 || August 18 || @ White Sox || 8–2 || Norris (11–7) || Sale (10–3) || – || U.S. Cellular Field || 17,686 || 71–52 || W2
|- bgcolor=#bbffbb
| 124 || August 19 || @ White Sox || 5–1 || Tillman (10–5) || Quintana (6–10) || – || U.S. Cellular Field || 13,307 || 72–52 ||W3
|- bgcolor=#bbffbb
| 125 || August 20 || @ White Sox || 4–3 || Chen (13–4) || Noesí (7–9) || Britton (27) || U.S. Cellular Field || 15,137 || 73–52 || W4
|- style="text-align:center; style="background-color:#ffbbbb;"
| 126 || August 22 || @ Cubs || 1–4 || Arrieta (7–4) || Gausman (7–5) || Rondón (20) || Wrigley Field || 33,761 || 73–53 || L1
|- style="text-align:center; style="background-color:#ffbbbb;"
| 127 || August 23 || @ Cubs || 2–7 || Grimm (4–2) || Norris (11–8) || – || Wrigley Field || 37,156 || 73–54 || L2
|- style="text-align:center; style="background-color:#ffbbbb;"
| 128 || August 24 || @ Cubs || 1–2 || Wada (4–1) || González (6–7) || Rondón (21) || Wrigley Field || 32,774 || 73–55 || L3
|- bgcolor=#bbffbb
| 129 || August 25 || Rays || 9–1 || Tillman (11–5) || Odorizzi (9–11) || – || Camden Yards || 15,516 || 74–55 || W1
|- bgcolor=#bbffbb
| 130 || August 26 || Rays || 4–2 || Brach (5–0) || Balfour (1–6) || Britton (28) || Camden Yards || 16,406 || 75–55 || W2
|- style="text-align:center; style="background-color:#ffbbbb;"
| 131 || August 27 || Rays || 1–3 || Smyly (9–10) || Gausman (7–6) || McGee (15) || Camden Yards || 20,762 || 75–56 || L1
|- bgcolor=#bbffbb
| 132 || August 28 || Rays || 5–4 || Miller (4–5) || Yates (0–2) || Britton (29) || Camden Yards || 16,915 || 76–56 || W1
|- bgcolor=#bbffbb
| 133 || August 29 || Twins || 9–1 ||González (7–7) ||May (0–4) || – || Camden Yards ||27,464 || 77–56 ||W2
|- bgcolor=#bbffbb
| 134 || August 30 || Twins || 3–2 ||Miller (5–5) || Burton (2–3)|| Britton (30)|| Camden Yards ||30,322 || 78–56 ||W3
|- bgcolor=#bbffbb
| 135 || August 31 || Twins || 12–8 ||Chen (14–4) ||Nolasco (5–10) ||Britton (31) || Camden Yards ||40,905 || 79–56 ||W4
|-

|- style="text-align:center; style="background-color:#ffbbbb;"
| 136 || September 1 || Twins || 4–6 ||Hughes (15–9) ||Gausman (7–7) || Perkins (33)|| Camden Yards ||33,156 || 79–57 ||L1
|- bgcolor=#bbffbb
| 137 || September 2 || Reds || 5–4 || Norris (12–8) || Latos (5–4) || Britton (32) || Camden Yards || 15,021 || 80–57 || W1
|- bgcolor=#bbffbb
| 138 || September 3 || Reds || 6–0 || González (8–7) || Axelrod (1–1) || – || Camden Yards || 20,246 || 81–57 || W2
|- bgcolor=#bbffbb
| 139 || September 4 || Reds || 9–7 || Hunter (3–2) || Parra (0–2) || Britton (33) || Camden Yards || 21,114 || 82–57 || W3
|- style="text-align:center; style="background-color:#ffbbbb;"
| 140 || September 5 || @ Rays || 0–3 || Boxberger (4–1) || Webb (3–3) || McGee (16) || Tropicana Field || 14,632 || 82–58 || L1
|- style="text-align:center; style="background-color:#ffbbbb;"
| 141 || September 6 || @ Rays || 2–3 || Boxberger (5–1) || Brach (5–1) || – || Tropicana Field || 17,969 || 82–59 || L2
|- bgcolor=#bbffbb
| 142 || September 7 || @ Rays || 7–5 (11) || Brach (6–1) || Ramos (2–6) || Miller (1) || Tropicana Field || 19,914 || 83–59 || W1
|- bgcolor=#bbffbb
| 143 || September 8 || @ Red Sox || 4–0 || González (9–7) || Kelly (3–4) || – || Fenway Park || 35,894 || 84–59 || W2
|- bgcolor=#bbffbb
| 144 || September 9 || @ Red Sox || 4–1 || Tillman (12–5) || Ranaudo (3–2) || Britton (34) || Fenway Park || 37,008 || 85–59 || W3
|- bgcolor=#bbffbb
| 145 || September 10 || @ Red Sox || 10–6 || Chen (15–4) || Workman (1–9) || O'Day (3) || Fenway Park || 35,374 || 86–59 || W4
|- bgcolor=#bbffbb
| 146 || September 12 || Yankees || 2–1 (11) || Brach (7–1) || Warren (3–6) || – || Camden Yards || 31,871 || 87–59 || W5
|- bgcolor=#bbffbb
| 147 || September 12 || Yankees || 5–0 || Norris (13–8) || Mitchell (0–1) || – || Camden Yards || 43,707 || 88–59 || W6
|- style="text-align:center; style="background-color:#ffbbbb;"
| 148 || September 13 || Yankees || 2–3 || Greene (5–3) || González (9–8) || Robertson (36) || Camden Yards || 44,231 || 88–60 || L1
|- bgcolor=#bbffbb
| 149 || September 14 || Yankees || 3–2 || O'Day (5–1) || Robertson (2–5) || – || Camden Yards || 43,947 || 89–60 || W1
|- bgcolor=#bbffbb
| 150 || September 15 || Blue Jays || 5–2 || Chen (16–4) || Stroman (10–6) || Britton (35) || Camden Yards || 25,061 || 90–60 || W2
|- style="text-align:center; background-color:#003399; color:white"
| 151 || September 16 || Blue Jays || 8–2 || Jiménez (5–9) || [[Drew Hutchison (baseball)Hutchison]] (10–12) || – || Camden Yards || 35,297 || 91–60 || W3
|- bgcolor=#bbffbb
| 152 || September 17 || Blue Jays || 6–1 || Norris (14–8) || Happ (9–11) || – || Camden Yards || 37,537 || 92–60 || W4
|- style="text-align:center; style="background-color:#ffbbbb;"
| 153 || September 19 || Red Sox || 3–5 (10) || Tazawa (4–3) || O'Day (5–2) || Mujica (7) || Camden Yards || 39,079 || 92–61 || L1
|- bgcolor=#bbffbb
| 154 || September 20 || Red Sox || 7–2 ||Tillman (13–5) || De La Rosa (4–8)|| –  || Camden Yards ||43,015 || 93–61 ||W1
|- style="text-align:center; style="background-color:#ffbbbb;"
| 155 || September 21 || Red Sox || 2–3 || Kelly (5–4) || González (9–9) || Mujica (8) || Camden Yards || 38,329 || 93–62 || L1
|- style="text-align:center; style="background-color:#ffbbbb;"
| 156 || September 22 || @ Yankees || 0–5 || Pineda (4–5) || Chen (16–5) || – || Yankee Stadium || 35,614 || 93–63 || L2
|- bgcolor=#bbffbb
| 157 || September 23 || @ Yankees || 5–4 || Jiménez (6–9) || McCarthy (10–15) || Britton (36) || Yankee Stadium || 43,201 || 94–63 || W1
|- bgcolor=#bbffbb
| 158 || September 24 || @ Yankees || 9–5 || Norris (15–8) || Greene (5–4) || – || Yankee Stadium || 46,056 || 95–63 || W2
|- style="text-align:center; style="background-color:#ffbbbb;"
| 159 || September 25 || @ Yankees || 5–6 || Robertson (4–5) || Meek (0–4) || – || Yankee Stadium || 48,613 || 95–64 || L1
|- style="text-align:center; style="background-color:#ffbbbb;"
| 160 || September 26 || @ Blue Jays || 2–4 || Hutchison (11–13) || Tillman (13–6) || Stroman (1) || Rogers Centre || 27,037 || 95–65 || L2
|- style="text-align:center; style="background-color:#ffbbbb;"
| 161 || September 27 || @ Blue Jays || 2–4 || Happ (11–11) || Chen (16–6) || Janssen (25) || Rogers Centre || 37,996 || 95–66 || L3
|- bgcolor=#bbffbb
| 162 || September 28 || @ Blue Jays || 1–0 || González (10–9) || Dickey (14–13) || Britton (37) || Rogers Centre || 45,901 || 96–66 || W1
|-

Post-season

Division Series

The Orioles swept the Detroit Tigers in the Division Series.

ALDS notes
 The 12 runs scored by the Orioles in Game 1 were the most runs the Orioles have ever scored in a post-season game.
The Orioles sweep of the Tigers was their first post-season sweep since 1971 when they beat the Oakland Athletics 3–0.
By winning successive games against 2011, 2012 and 2013 Cy Young Award winners Justin Verlander, David Price and Max Scherzer, the Orioles became only the fourth team to win a postseason series over three Cy Young winners, the only one ever to do so in consecutive games, and the only one not against the 1990s Braves trio of Tom Glavine, Greg Maddux and John Smoltz. In fact, with the final regular-season win over Toronto's R. A. Dickey, the Orioles won 4 consecutive games started by Cy Young winners, an unprecedented feat.

Championship Series

The Orioles were swept by the Kansas City Royals 4 games to 0 in the AL pennant series.

Postseason game log

|- style="text-align:center; style="background-color:#bbffbb;"
| 1 || October 2  || Tigers || 12–3 || Tillman (1–0) ||Scherzer (0–1) || — || Camden Yards || 47,842 || 1–0
|- style="text-align:center; style="background-color:#bbffbb;"
| 2 || October 3  ||   Tigers || 7–6 || Brach (1–0) || Soria (0–1)|| Britton (1) || Camden Yards || 48,058 || 2–0
|- style="text-align:center; style="background-color:#bbffbb;"
| 3 || October 5  ||  @ Tigers || 2–1 || Norris (1–0) ||  Price (0–1) || Britton (2) || Comerica Park || 43,013 || 3–0
|-

2014 ALDS Composite Box Score

|- style="text-align:center; style="background-color:#ffbbbb;"
| 1 || October 10 || Royals || 6–8 (10) || Davis (1–0) || O'Day (0–1) || Holland (1) || Camden Yards || 47,124 || 0–1
|- style="text-align:center; style="background-color:#ffbbbb;"
| 2 || October 11 || Royals || 4–6 || Davis (2–0) || O'Day (0–2) || Holland (2) ||Camden Yards || 46,912 || 0–2
|- style="text-align:center; style="background-color:#ffbbbb;"  
| 3 || October 14 || @ Royals || 1–2 || Frasor (1–0) || Chen (0–1) || Holland (3) || Kauffman Stadium || 40,183 || 0–3
|- style="text-align:center; style="background-color:#ffbbbb;" 
| 4 || October 15 || @ Royals || 1–2 || Vargas (1–0) || González (0–1) || Holland (4) || Kauffman Stadium || 40,468 || 0–4
|-

2014 ALCS Composite Box Score

Accolades
The following players represented the Orioles in the 2014 Major League Baseball All-Star Game

Nelson Cruz (3rd appearance)
Adam Jones (4th appearance)
Matt Wieters (3rd appearance)

DH Nelson Cruz won the MLB and American League home run championships with 40

Center fielder Adam Jones and Right fielder Nick Markakis both won the Rawlings Gold Glove Award.

Manager Buck Showalter was named the American League Manager of the Year, his third award.

General Manager Dan Duquette was named The Sporting News' Major League Baseball Executive of the Year

Roster

Farm system

References

External links

2014 Baltimore Orioles season at Official site 
2014 Baltimore Orioles season at Baseball Reference

Baltimore Orioles seasons
Baltimore Orioles
Baltimore Orioles
American League East champion seasons